Agnès Zugasti (born 15 May 1972) is a French former professional tennis player.

Biography
Zugasti reached a best singles ranking of 169 in the world, with three ITF titles.

During the early 1990s she competed in WTA Tour events. She took Nathalie Tauziat, then the world number 15, to a final set tiebreak in a first round loss at Bayonne in 1991. Her only main draw win came at the 1992 Birmingham Classic, where she beat Shannan McCarthy before being eliminated in the second round by top seed Zina Garrison.

At the 1992 French Open she played as a wildcard in the women's singles.

ITF finals

Singles (3–2)

Doubles (1–0)

References

External links
 
 

1972 births
Living people
French female tennis players